The Chemeketa Cooperative Regional Library Service (CCRLS) is a library cooperative serving residents of the Chemeketa Community College district, which includes most of Polk, Yamhill, and Marion Counties, and a small portion of Linn County in Oregon. The CCRLS offices are located on the campus of the Chemeketa Community College in Hayesville, an unincorporated suburb of Salem, Oregon. The Cooperative works in tandem with the member libraries to determine services, policies, and procedures. The organization is governed by the College Board of Education, with input from the CCRLS Advisory Council, made up of one lay member from each county and one representing the rural areas, five library directors, and one city manager.
Although considered a public library by the State of Oregon, CCRLS has no holdings of its own, but operates as a service overlay coordinating 16 independent and locally owned libraries into a cohesive system able to provide service to all citizens of the District.

History
In 1972, a $12,000 Library Services and Technology Act grant was given by the Oregon State Library to the Mid-Willamette Valley Council of Governments to fund a study of the library needs of citizens in the tri-county area surrounding Salem, Oregon. At that time, statistics showed that of the 240,500 residents of the area, 100,000 did not have local library service.  The plan that developed out of this study recommended implementation of five basic services: a bookmobile, courier service between libraries, a district-wide library card, provision of reference and information service to smaller libraries, and a film circuit service. Unable to fund a bookmobile in the first year of operation, a books-by-mail service was implemented, instead. Initial funding was provided by a 1973 Library Services and Construction Act grant. At that time, the Chemeketa Community College administration was designated the fiscal agent for the grant money funding the new Library Service. The Cooperative began operating in 1974, and in its first two years provided library service to 41,800 previously unserved, rural users. In 1975, special legislation (Oregon Senate Bill 160) authorized community college districts to establish public libraries, clearing the way for CCRLS to operate as a department of Chemeketa Community College.

During its first decade of existence, CCRLS was funded through a series of levies.  The Service was highly visible to the public because of the necessity to approach the voters every few years for funding. Services changed in a minor way, with books-by-mail eventually being deleted as a less cost effective service. In 1985 the Chemeketa District voters approved a tax base for the college, a portion of which was dedicated to CCRLS. This created (before the years of property tax limitations), the first stable funding for a public library multi-jurisdictional system in the State of Oregon. This funding allowed CCRLS to pursue library automation, and for the first time, the CCRLS member libraries were linked by a computer network and integrated library system that allowed library users to search all 18 libraries' catalogs at one time, and request material from any of those locations to be delivered to their home library within days.

CCRLS today

Current CCRLS services include: reimbursement to cities for serving non-city patrons, courier service among libraries, lost book reimbursement, an integrated automated system, net lending reimbursement, a rotating collection of bestsellers for small libraries, and a pass-through grant from State funding for children's services. All direct services to patrons, including bookmobile services, have been discontinued. Instead, CCRLS provides greater service to the member libraries in the form of computer networking and equipment, centralized software administration and support, cataloging services, and payment for numerous online services such as downloadable audio and ebooks, readers' advisory services, language learning software, and access to online databases available through the Oregon State Library.

CCRLS member libraries
CCRLS membership includes 16 public libraries and one community college library:

Amity Public Library, Amity, Oregon
Chemeketa Community College Library, Chemeketa Community College
Dallas Public Library, Dallas, Oregon
Dayton (Mary Gilkey) Public Library, Dayton, Oregon
Independence Public Library, Independence, Oregon
Jefferson Public Library, Jefferson, Oregon
Lyons Public Library, Lyons, Oregon
McMinnville Public Library, McMinnville, Oregon
Monmouth Public Library, Monmouth, Oregon
Mount Angel Public Library, Mount Angel, Oregon
Newberg Public Library, Newberg, Oregon
Salem Public Library, Salem, Oregon
Sheridan Public Library, Sheridan, Oregon
Silver Falls Library District
Stayton Public Library, Stayton, Oregon
Willamina Public Library, Willamina, Oregon
Woodburn Public Library, Woodburn, Oregon

See also

 Library Information Network of Clackamas County
 Multnomah County Library
 Washington County Cooperative Library Services

References

External links
 

Education in Marion County, Oregon
Education in Yamhill County, Oregon
Salem, Oregon
Public libraries in Oregon
1974 establishments in Oregon
Education in Polk County, Oregon
Marion County
Sheridan, Oregon
Library consortia in Oregon